The SeaWorld SkyTower is an observation tower located in the SeaWorld Orlando theme park complex constructed in 1973 and opened in 1974. The tower is the tallest observation tower in Florida and contains a double decker rotating pod. SkyTower is lit with an array of Electronic Theater Control's LEDs as of February 2013. However the height of the tower is 400 feet (122 m) tall from the base to the top of the structure, including topping flagpole)

Incidents
On December 22, 2015, at the height of the Christmas travel season, the SkyTower became stuck, 200 feet up. There were about 50 people on the ride at the time, and it took two hours to get all passengers down. This was the first known incident on the ride.

See also
List of tallest buildings in Orlando

References

External links 
 SeaWorld SkyTower

Towers in Florida
SeaWorld Orlando
Amusement rides introduced in 1974
Buildings and structures in Orlando, Florida
Towers completed in 1974
1974 establishments in Florida